The National Zoo is a zoo in Malaysia located on  of land in Ulu Klang, Gombak District, Selangor, Malaysia. It was officially opened on November 14, 1963 by the country's first prime minister Tunku Abdul Rahman. The zoo is managed by a non-governmental organization known as the Malaysian Zoological Society and is home to 5,137 animals of 476 different species. It received MS ISO 9001:2008 certification in July, 2007, and is a member of the South East Asian Zoos Association (SEAZA). The president and chairman of the zoo is Y. Bhg. Dato' Ismail Hutson.

History

In 1957, the Malayan Agri-Horticultural Association (MAHA) opened a miniature zoo. After the creation of the mini-zoo, the idea of a proper zoo gradually gained momentum, and the federal government chose a spot in Ulu Klang, Selangor, next to the border of Kuala Lumpur. In the 1960s, Ulu Klang was an undeveloped green area. In 1963, the first prime minister of Malaya (now Malaysia) YTM Tunku Abdul Rahman opened the zoo to the public. Zoo Negara was known as the "Zoo in the Jungle" due to the lush vegetation that dominated the region.

The zoo welcomed its millionth visitor on 14 November 1966, just three years after opening, and by 1986, the zoo was attracting over 1 million visitors per year.

The zoo remained surrounded by dense tropical forest until the late 1970s when Kuala Lumpur experienced rapid population growth fueled by an economic boom.  Nearby Ulu Klang was targeted for large scale residential development to accommodate the expanding urban population, resulting in habitat loss in formerly wild areas surrounding the zoo.

In the late 1990s and early 2000s, there were plans to move the zoo to other locations in Selangor. However, the plans were largely unpopular among the public as they were seen as an effort by some developers to capitalise on the value of the zoo's large land. But with the support from the Ministry of Natural Resources and Environment and the [Selangor] State Government, it was decided not to relocate zoo.

Transportation
To access Zoo Negara, you can opt one of the three bus routes: 
Metrobus bus 16 from Central Market
Rapid KL bus number 253 from Putra LRT station, Wangsa Maju.
Rapid KL bus number 220 from Leboh Ampang.

Exhibits

There are 16 exhibits in the zoo.

Reptile Park

The Reptile Park has both indoor and outdoor exhibits, and includes saltwater crocodiles, false gharials, and dwarf crocodiles. It also exhibits tortoises and terrapins, including Aldabra giant tortoises (the second largest tortoise species in the world) and local Tutong or river terrapins. Snakes in the collection include green anacondas, reticulated pythons, and many venomous and non-venomous snakes.

The Amphibian World center at the Reptile Park has a variety of frogs and toads that originate from various habitats in Malaysia.

Giant Panda Conservation Centre

In 2014, a male and female giant panda pair named Xing Xing and Liang Liang went on public display at an air-conditioned, purpose-built Giant Panda Conservation Centre next to tram stop T5. The pandas are on a 10-year loan to Malaysia. On 26 May 2018, Yi Yi, a four-month old female panda went on show for the first time. The cub is the second born in Malaysia. The cub's sister, Nuan Nuan, was born in August 2015 and sent back to China in 2017 as part of Beijing's agreement with Malaysia that cubs born in captivity must be sent back to China at the age of two. Third giant panda cub born at Malaysia zoo in June, 2021.

Malaysian Elephants

The zoo is home to three Asian elephants: two females, Siti who was born in 1979 in Fraser's Hill; Sibol, who was born in 1978 at Temerloh and a male, Teriang, who was born in 1980. He was named after Teriang, the place he was born. The trio have been in the zoo since they were very young.

Lake Birds
The Lake Birds exhibit includes painted storks, ibises, egrets, swans and pelicans.

Bird Aviary
This aviary holds over a hundred species of birds from all around the world. The Birds Photo Corner in the aviary lets visitors take souvenir photos with a variety of macaws and cockatoos on weekends.

Nocturnal Exhibits
These indoor exhibits are home to fruit bats, the largest bat in the world, which are sometimes called flying foxes, as well as mousedeer.

Australian Plain
Australian Plain is home to emus, agile wallabies, red kangaroos, and red-legged pademelons.

Humboldt Penguins
This exhibit is home to Humboldt penguins.

Children's World
Houses a variety of mostly domestic animals including goats, rabbits, ducks, and chickens running around freely, as well as parrots and guinea pigs. It includes a mini-rainforest with a variety of plants and insects, as well as a small aviary, fish pond, miniature horse barn, and playground.

Bear Complex
The Bear Complex is home to several types of bear including Asian black bears, brown bears, and sun bears.

Savannah Walk
The Savannah Walk is one of the largest open concept exhibits in the zoo, and is home to giraffes, plains zebras, ostriches, white rhinos, sable antelopes, and scimitar oryx.

Nile Hippopotamus
This exhibit is home to Nile hippos and pygmy hippos. The zoo has three Nile hippopotamuses: Duke, Kibu, and Chombie. Chombie was born at the zoo.

Mammal Kingdom
The Mammal Kingdom exhibit includes Indian leopards, pumas, leopard cats, masked palm civets, pygmy slow lorises, raccoons, striped hyenas, binturong and Malayan porcupines.

Freshwater Aquaria
Zoo Negara's Tunku Abdul Rahman Aquarium is the first ecological-based freshwater aquarium that highlights the Malaysian river and wetlands. The aquarium exhibits show the ecosystem or the habitats of Malaysian river systems in the upper, middle, lower estuarine zones and finally, the sea. The aquarium features fish that are commonly seen in Malaysian rivers, as well as rare and endangered species including invertebrates such as crabs, prawns, corals, and aquatic insects.

Cat Walk
The Cat Walk features African lions, Malayan tigers and white tigers.

Ape Centre
The Ape Centre is home to Bornean and Sumatran orangutans, and chimpanzees.

Insect Zoo
Zoo Negara has also built an insect zoo where more than 200 species of insects from around the world are housed.

Among the insects at the zoo are butterflies such as the Rajah Brooke's birdwing, tree nymph and Indian leafwing species, orchid and dead leaf mantises, man-faced stink bugs, tarantulas, Malaysian giant scorpions and many more.

Hornbill Centre
Opened in 2010, this breeding centre houses 7 species of hornbills native to Malaysia, including great hornbills, Oriental pied hornbills, rhinoceros hornbills and wrinkled hornbills.

Other animals
Other animals in the zoo's collection include Ankole cattle, Asian small-clawed otters, axis deer, banteng, barasingha, Cape fur seals, capybara, dromedary camels, gaur, greater flamingos, lion-tailed macaques, Malayan tapirs and sambar deer.

Other attractions

Sea lions, macaques and macaws are part of a Multi-Animal Show that is shown twice daily. 
Train rides and guided tours are available on weekends.
The Mini Bee Museum is located at the heart of Zoo Negara and helps educate visitors about the many types of bees in the country.
The Multi-Animal Photo Corner is located by the zoo's main entrance, and is opens on weekends. Visitors can have their pictures taken with snakes, miniature horses and birds.

Conservation

Zoo Negara has bred over 200 highly endangered milky storks. The zoo is currently working with the local Wildlife Department on a release program for these birds. Other breeding achievements include hornbills and the freshwater crocodile – false gharial.

References

External links

Zoo Negara Live!
Tourism Malaysia – Zoo Negara

Zoos in Malaysia
Gombak District
Buildings and structures in Selangor
Tourist attractions in Selangor
Zoos established in 1963
1963 establishments in Malaysia